Brian Frederick Gilbert Johnson (born 11 September 1938 in Northampton, England) is a British scientist and emeritus professor of chemistry at the University of Cambridge. He was also Master of Fitzwilliam College, Cambridge from 1999 to 2005.

Education
Johnson was educated at Northampton Grammar School and the  University of Nottingham where he was awarded Bachelor of Science and PhD degrees.

Research
During his career, Johnson has conducted extensive research into many different areas of chemistry, most recently on nano particles. He had a long running research partnership with Jack Lewis, with whom he discovered a number of unusual metal carbonyl clusters.

Awards
Johnson was elected a Fellow of the Royal Society in 1991. His nomination reads

References

1938 births
Living people
People from Northampton
Fellows of Fitzwilliam College, Cambridge
Masters of Fitzwilliam College, Cambridge
English chemists
Members of Academia Europaea
Fellows of the Royal Society
Recipients of the Great Cross of the National Order of Scientific Merit (Brazil)
Members of the University of Cambridge Department of Chemistry
Alumni of the University of Nottingham
Fellows of the Royal Society of Chemistry
Fellows of the Royal Society of Edinburgh